Daniel Mathews may refer to:

Daniel Koat Mathews (born 1937), Sudanese politician
Daniel T. J. Mathews, American politician from Mississippi

See also
Daniel Matthews (disambiguation)